Pat Sin Leng is a mountain range in the northeast New Territories of Hong Kong, located within the Pat Sin Leng Country Park. The name Pat Sin Leng literally means "Ridge of the Eight Immortals", who are eight well-known xian ("Immortals; Transcendents; Fairies") in Chinese Mythology. The eight peaks along the Pat Sin Leng mountain range are each named after a different Immortal.

Mountain peaks

There are eight peaks whose elevation range from 489m - 590m. From west to east, they are:

Shun Yeung Fung 
Shun Yeung Fung is the sixteenth highest peak in Hong Kong with an elevation of 590m, located in north Tai Po of New Territories. It is also the westernmost and highest peak of the Pat Sing Leng mountain range. The peak is named after the leader of Eight Immortals, Lü Dongbin's secular name Chunyang Zi.

Chung Li Fung
Chung Li Fung is a mountain peak, part of the Pat Sin Leng range with an elevation of 529m. The peak is named after one of the Eight Immortals, Zhongli Han.

Kao Lao Fung
Kao Lao Fung is a mountain peak, part of the Pat Sin Leng range with an elevation of 543m. The peak is named after one of the Eight Immortals, Elder Zhang Guo.

Kuai Li Fung
Kuai Li Fung is a mountain peak, part of the Pat Sin Leng range with an elevation of 522m. The peak is named after one of the Eight Immortals, Iron-Crutch Li.

Tsao Kau Fung 
Tsao Kau Fung is a mountain peak, part of the Pat Sin Leng range with an elevation of 508m. The peak is named after one of the Eight Immortals, Royal Uncle Cao.

Choi Wo Fung 
Choi Wo Fung is a mountain peak, part of the Pat Sin Leng range with an elevation of 489m. The peak is named after one of the Eight Immortals, Lan Caihe.

Sheung Tsz Fung 
Sheung Tsz Fung is a mountain peak, part of the Pat Sin Leng range with an elevation of 513m. The peak is named after one of the Eight Immortals, Han Xiang.

Hsien Ku Fung
Hsien Ku Fung is a mountain peak, part of the Pat Sin Leng range with an elevation of 511m. This is the easternmost peak of the range. The peak is named after one of the Eight Immortals, Immortal Woman He.

1996 hillfire

A hill fire broke out on Pat Sin Leng on 10 February 1996, when a group of 49 teachers and students from HKCWC Fung Yiu King Memorial Secondary School were hiking in the mountains. 200 firemen and 4 helicopters were sent to rescue the group. Two teachers, Chau Chi Chai and Wong Sau Mei and three students died, with 13 others injured.

Spring Breeze Pavilion was built on the mountain in memory of the five who died. It was inaugurated by the then-Governor of Hong Kong, Chris Patten, on 12 March 1996.

See also
List of mountains, peaks and hills in Hong Kong
Wong Leng
Tai Mei Tuk

References

External links

Pat Sin Leng at the official web site of the Agriculture, Fisheries and Conservation Department of Hong Kong

Mountain ranges of Hong Kong
Tai Po District
North District, Hong Kong